Let's Dance is a 2007 French-Swiss film directed by Noémie Lvovsky and written by Lvovsky and Florence Seyvos. The film received 3 César Award nominations.

Cast
Jean-Pierre Marielle as Salomon Bellinsky
Valeria Bruni Tedeschi as Sarah Bellinsky
Sabine Azéma as Violette
Bulle Ogier as Geneviève Bellinsky
Bakary Sangaré as M. Mootoosamy
Arié Elmaleh as François
John Arnold as Adolf Hitler
Anne Alvaro as Marie-Hélène
Tsilla Chelton as Tatiana
Nicolas Maury as Client Manager 
Daniel Emilfork as Army medical officer 
Judith Chemla as Female student 
Cécile Reigher as Nurse 
Michel Fau as Psychiatrist 
Jutta Sammel as Sarah, age 8 
Michele Gleizer as Gynaecologist 
Philippe Nagau as Tap-dancing instructor 
Rosette as Secretary

Accolades
César Awards (France)
Nominated: Best Actor – Leading Role (Jean-Pierre Marielle)
Nominated: Best Actress – Supporting Role (Bulle Ogier)
Nominated: Best Music Written for a Film (Archie Shepp)

References

External links

2007 films
2000s French-language films
Films directed by Noémie Lvovsky
2007 comedy-drama films
French comedy-drama films
2007 comedy films
2007 drama films
2000s French films